Syrian cuisine is a Middle Eastern cuisine that includes the cooking traditions and practices of modern Syria (as opposed to Greater Syria), merging the habits of people who settled in Syria throughout its history. 

Syrian cuisine mainly uses eggplant, zucchini, garlic, meat (mostly from lamb and sheep), sesame seeds, rice, chickpeas, fava beans, lentils, cabbage, cauliflower, vine leaves, pickled turnips, cucumbers, tomatoes, olive oil, lemon juice, mint, pistachios, honey and fruits.

At the beginning of the 21st century, selections of appetizers known as mezze are customarily served along with Arabic bread before the Syrian meal's main course, which is followed by coffee, with sweet confections or fruits at will. Many recipes date from at least the 13th century.

Foods

Meze

Stuffed vine leaves

Kebab

Kibbe

A variety of Syrian dishes made from a fried, baked, grilled, cooked, or raw mixture of bulghur and minced lamb are called Kibbe.

Mahshi (Stuffed squash)

A famous dish served in Syria is made from vegetables (usually zucchini— / kūsā, or eggplant— / bādhinjān) which are stuffed ( / maḥshī) with ground beef or lamb or mutton, nuts, and rice.

Street food

Syrian street food includes:

Sweets

Cakes 
 Nygella cake

Cheeses

Halloumi—a semi-hard, unripened, brined cheese
Jibne baida—a white hard cheese with a pronounced salty taste
Jibne khadra—a form of string cheese, originated in Syria, also known as Jibneh mshallaleh
Shanklish—a type of blue cheese made from cow's or sheep's milk and often served topped with dried thyme and olive oil

Beverages

See also

 Mediterranean cuisine
 Levantine cuisine
 Middle Eastern cuisine
 Arab cuisine

References 

 Syrian wine Château Bargylus

Further reading

External links

 
Syria
Syria
Syria
Syria